Man'gyŏngbong Sports Club (만경봉체육단) is a North Korean football club. The club plays in the DPR Korea League, the top-flight football league of North Korea. Man'gyŏngbong Stadium, which has a capacity for 2,000 people, is their home venue.

The club's football training facilities were upgraded in November 2013, including the installation of artificial turf meeting FIFA standards on the training pitch; when the work was completed, it was inspected by Kim Jong-un.

References

Football clubs in North Korea